Patterson High School (formerly known as Patterson Park High School) is a public high school located in the Hopkins-Bayview neighborhood in Baltimore, Maryland, United States.

Academics
Patterson High School gained media attention in 2022 when a report showed 75 percent of students tested at the school were reading and doing math an elementary school level. The school's attendance rate was 59 percent, compared to the district average of 80 percent, and dropout rate was 29 percent, with a college enrollment rate of 21 percent, meaning "more students quit school than enroll in higher education".  Maryland Governor Larry Hogan commented, "Baltimore City School system is not doing a great job educating the kids...I was disgusted by it".

Overview
Patterson High School is a comprehensive high school with approximately 1200 students, grades nine through twelve. The lead principal is Mr. Vance Benton, 1st African American to hold the position in the school's history. Patterson no longer operates as academies, but instead as a cohort model. Students are divided into cohorts based on their year of expected graduation.

Each cohort is led by a lead principal with a dedicated cohort counselor. 
The class of 2020's lead principal is Ernestine Edler, the class of 2021 is led by Aaron Hippolyte, the class of 2022 by Maxwell Aukwu, while the class of 2023 is led by Christian Licier. Patterson is designated as the Career Center school for Baltimore's East Side. The school is a social emotional learning, student wholeness site that offers multiple pathways in Career and Technology Education (CTE); Patterson students take pathway courses during their tenth, eleventh, and twelfth grade years, in addition to  Maryland State Graduation Requirements, University of Maryland Systems requirements, and a wide variety of elective courses. Pathways at Patterson for the 2019–20 school year include:

 Academy of Engineering / Project Lead the Way 
 Computer Science
 Certified Nursing Assistant
 Pharmacy Technician
 Emergency Medical Technician
 Homeland Security & Emergency Preparedness 
 Advertising & Graphic Design 
 Administrative Services
 Early Childhood Education 
 Cosmetic Services 
 Construction Design & Management(CADD) 
 Finance & Accounting 
 Air Force J-ROTC
 Band

Patterson has a diverse student population. The ESOL Program has both Emergent and Newcomers Program and support for ESOL students throughout their integrated classes by offering mentoring and partnerships with Liberty's Promise and Refugee Youth Program.

In 2012 a Patterson student won first place in the Baltimore City Math Bowl.

Patterson High School is the assumed school which Hairspray’s main character, Tracy Turnblad, goes to.

Athletics
In 1993, Patterson, along with all the other Baltimore City public schools, left the Maryland Scholastic Association (MSA) to join the Maryland Public Secondary Schools Athletic Association (MPSSAA).  The move meant that Baltimore City Public Schools would be able to compete with the rest of the state's public schools in a variety of sports arenas.  Since the move, the Clippers have been to the state semi-finals in 1994, 1999, 2004 and to the quarter-finals in 1993, 1995, 1996, 1998 and 2001.

Notable alumni
 Peter Angelos – Owner of MLB's Baltimore Orioles, trial lawyer.
 Dick Bielski – former NFL running back for the Philadelphia Eagles, Dallas Cowboys, and Baltimore Colts; one-time Pro Bowler.
 Aquille Carr - Played for the D-League affiliate of the *Houston Rockets
 Robert F. Chew - actor, known for his role as Proposition Joe in the TV series The Wire.
 Raymond A. Dypski (1969, GED) - Member of the Maryland House of Delegates
 Cal Ermer - former MLB player Washington Senators, MLB manager Minnesota Twins, MLB coach Baltimore Orioles, Milwaukee Brewers and Oakland A's, former Hall of Fame soccer coach at University of Baltimore
 Ed Listopad – former NFL guard for the Chicago Cardinals.
 Fred Manfra (1964) – radio play-by-play announcer for the Baltimore Orioles.
 Aris Melissaratos - Dean of the Stevenson University Brown School of Business and Leadership
 Dave Pivec – Owner of Pivec Advertising, former tight end for NFL's LA Rams and Notre Dame, owner of MLL Baltimore Bayhawks.
 Carl Runk – retired football and lacrosse coach at Towson University.
 Perry Sfikas – (D), Maryland State Senate, District 46, Baltimore City & Baltimore County.
 Theodore J. Sophocleus – (D), Member of the Maryland House of Delegates, Anne Arundel County (1999–2018).
 Joe Speca – member of the Maryland Athletic Hall of Fame and Maryland Soccer Hall of Fame; former coach of Baltimore Bays soccer team.

References

External links
 Patterson High School - Maryland Report Card

Public schools in Baltimore
Public high schools in Maryland